Roger Michael Burnley  (born June 1966) is a British businessman, and was the chief executive (CEO) of Asda from January 2018, when he  succeeded Sean Clarke, until August 2021.

Early life
Burnley was born in Dewsbury, Yorkshire, and grew up in Yorkshire. He was educated at Heckmondwike Grammar School. He earned a degree in geography from Bournemouth University.

Career
He started his career as a graduate trainee with B&Q.

From 1996 to 2002, he worked for Asda, rising to supply chain director.

Burnley was Sainsbury's retail and operations director before joining Asda as chief operating officer in 2016 and then deputy chief executive in June 2016.

On 30 October 2017, it was announced that he would succeed Sean Clarke as CEO of Asda.

Burnley left Asda on 6 August 2021, six months earlier than expected, leaving Asda without a CEO.

He was appointed Commander of the Order of the British Empire (CBE) in the 2022 New Year Honours for services to the food supply chain.

Personal life
Burnley is married, has two children and lives in Yorkshire. He a lifelong fan of Huddersfield Town A.F.C.

References

1966 births
Living people
British chief executives
Alumni of Bournemouth University
People from Dewsbury
People educated at Heckmondwike Grammar School
Huddersfield Town A.F.C. non-playing staff
Commanders of the Order of the British Empire